Knowsley South was a constituency in Merseyside, represented in the House of Commons of the Parliament of the United Kingdom. It elected one Member of Parliament (MP) by the first past the post system of election.

It existed from 1983 to 2010.

History
Sean Hughes of the Labour Party held the seat from its creation at the 1983 election until his death in June 1990.  The resulting by-election that September was won by Eddie O'Hara, also of the Labour Party.  O'Hara then held the seat until its abolition in 2010.

This was a safe Labour seat for the entire period of its existence, with the party's share of the vote exceeding 68% at all six elections in that time.

Boundaries
1983–1997: The Metropolitan Borough of Knowsley wards of Halewood East, Halewood South, Halewood West, Longview, Page Moss, Princess, Roby, St Gabriel's, St Michael's, Swanside, Whiston North, and Whiston South.

1997–2010: The Metropolitan Borough of Knowsley wards of Halewood East, Halewood South, Halewood West, Longview, Page Moss, Prescot East, Prescot West, Princess, Roby, St Gabriel's, St Michael's, Swanside, Whiston North, and Whiston South.

Knowsley South was created in 1983, replacing the former Huyton seat. The constituency covered the southern part of the metropolitan borough of Knowsley, including Halewood, Huyton, Prescot, Roby and Whiston.

This seat and its neighbour Knowsley North and Sefton East were abolished at the 2010 general election, following the decisions of the Boundary Commission for England.  Most of Knowsley South has formed the larger part of a new Knowsley constituency, except for the area around Halewood, which has become part of the new Garston and Halewood seat, and parts of Prescot and Whiston which have become part of St Helens South and Whiston.

Members of Parliament

Elections

Elections in the 1980s

Elections in the 1990s

Elections in the 2000s

See also 
 List of parliamentary constituencies in Merseyside

Notes and references 

Constituencies of the Parliament of the United Kingdom established in 1983
Constituencies of the Parliament of the United Kingdom disestablished in 2010
Politics of the Metropolitan Borough of Knowsley
Parliamentary constituencies in North West England (historic)